William R. Sylvester (January 31, 1922 – January 25, 1995) was an American actor, chiefly known for his film and television work in the United Kingdom. A graduate of the Royal Academy of Dramatic Art, he was a star of British B-movies in the 1950s and '60s, but gained widespread recognition for his role as Dr. Heywood Floyd in the landmark science-fiction film 2001: A Space Odyssey (1968).

Life and career
William Sylvester was born in Oakland, California, the son of Italian immigrant Joseph Silvester (1899–1941) and his American wife, Gertrude Bailey Silvester (1898–1957). He served in the U.S. Navy during the Second World War, and settled in Britain after the war to pursue his interest in professional acting. He became a staple of British B films at a time when American and Canadian actors were much in demand to give indigenous films some appeal in the United States. While in the UK, he married British actress Veronica Hurst.

As a result, he gained top billing in one of his first films, House of Blackmail (1953), directed by the veteran filmmaker Maurice Elvey, for whom he also made What Every Woman Wants the following year. He also starred in such minor films as A Stranger Came Home (1954, for Hammer), Dublin Nightmare (1958), Offbeat (1961), Information Received (1961), Incident at Midnight (1963), Blind Corner (1964), and Ring of Spies (1964).

There were also lead roles in four British horror films: Gorgo (1961), Devil Doll (1964), Devils of Darkness (1965) and The Hand of Night (1968).

After an uncredited role in You Only Live Twice (1967), Sylvester's next part was as Heywood R. Floyd in 2001 A Space Odyssey (1968). In spite of that prominent role, Sylvester appeared mainly on television and in small movie roles such as Busting (1974) (ironically directed by Peter Hyams, who would direct Roy Scheider as the character Dr. Heywood Floyd in 2010: The Year We Make Contact), The Hindenburg (1975) and Heaven Can Wait (1978).

Among his many television credits were a 1959 BBC version of Shakespeare's Julius Caesar (playing Mark Antony), The Saint, The Baron, The High Chaparral, Harry O, Danger Man, Banacek, The Six Million Dollar Man, Quincy, M.E. and he was a regular on the one-season science-fiction series Gemini Man created by Steven Bochco. 

Sylvester retired from acting during the early 1980s, and died in Sacramento, California, on January 25, 1995, six days before his 73rd birthday.

Selected filmography

 Give Us This Day (1949) – Giovanni
 They Were Not Divided (1950) – American Soldier (uncredited)
 The Yellow Balloon (1953) – Len
 Appointment in London (1953) – Mac
 House of Blackmail (1953) – Jimmy
 Albert R.N. (1953) – Lt. 'Texas' Norton
 What Every Woman Wants (1954) – Jim Bames
 A Stranger Came Home (1954) – Philip Vickers
 Portrait of Alison (1956) – Dave Forrester
 High Tide at Noon (1957) – Alec Douglas
 Dublin Nightmare (1958) – John Kevin
 Whirlpool (1959) – Herman
 Offbeat (1961) – Layton / Steve Ross
 Gorgo (1961) – Sam Slade
 Information Received (1961) – Rick Hogan
 Incident at Midnight (1963) – Vince Warren
 Ring of Spies (1964) – Gordon Lonsdale
 Devil Doll (1964) – Mark English
 Blind Corner (1964) – Paul Gregory
 Devils of Darkness (1965) – Paul Baxter
 You Only Live Twice (1967) – Pentagon Official (uncredited)
 Red and Blue (1967) – Trumpeter
 2001: A Space Odyssey (1968) – Dr. Heywood R. Floyd
 The Hand of Night (1968) – Paul Carver
 The Syndicate (1968) – Burt Hickey
 The Lawyer (1970) – Paul Harrison
 Don't Be Afraid of the Dark (1973) – Tom Henderson
 Busting (1974) – Mr. Weldman
 The Hindenburg (1975) – Luftwaffe Colonel
 Riding with Death (1976) – Leonard Driscoll
 Heaven Can Wait (1978) – Nuclear Reporter
 First Family (1980) – TV Commentator Howard

References

External links

1922 births
1995 deaths
American male film actors
American male television actors
20th-century American male actors
Alumni of RADA
United States Navy personnel of World War II
American expatriate male actors in the United Kingdom